Alfred Leo Buser (September 21, 1888 – December 3, 1956), nicknamed Al Buser, was an American football player and coach.  Buser played college football for the University of Wisconsin, and was recognized as an All-American. He later became the fourth head coach of the Florida Gators football team that represents the University of Florida.

Early years
Buser was born in Madison, Wisconsin in 1888. He attended Madison High School, where he was a stand-out high school football player and track and field athlete, and graduated in 1907.

College career
After graduating from high school, Buser attended the University of Wisconsin in Madison. Buser played tackle for the Wisconsin Badgers football team from 1908 to 1911. He memorably scored a touchdown as a lineman in the 1910 game against Chicago. As a senior, he was elected captain of the 1911 football team. The 1911 Badgers finished 5–1–1—their sole loss was a 5–0 edging by the Chicago Maroons. After his junior year, Buser was named an All-American by Outing magazine, after his senior season, Buser was again named an All-American by Outing, a first-team All-American by The New York Globe, a Walter Camp third-team All-American, and a Collier's first-team All-Western Conference tackle. He lettered three years in football and once in track, as a shot-putter.

Buser graduated from Wisconsin in 1912, and served as the director of athletics of the Wisconsin athletic association during 1913. Buser married the former Leila W. Mathews that same year.

Coaching career
From 1917 to 1919, Buser was the head coach of the Florida Gators football team that represented the University of Florida in Gainesville. Early expectations were high for Buser's first Gators team in 1917. The Gators opened their season with a 21–13 win over South Carolina Gamecocks, after falling behind early, but lost their remaining four Southern Intercollegiate Athletic Association (SIAA) games to the Tulane Green Wave, Auburn Tigers, Clemson Tigers, and Kentucky Wildcats. During his three seasons leading the Gators, Buser compiled a 7–8 record, including the one-game 1918 season shortened by the 1918 influenza pandemic and World War I. Buser was also the university's athletic director and the professor in charge of its physical education department. After an improved 5–3 season in 1919, Buser was replaced by William G. Kline.

In 1920, Buser was hired as athletic coach at Saint Paul Central High School in Saint Paul, Minnesota and mentored the football team for three seasons. He also coached a number of other sports at Central. Buser was the athletic director for Hamline University in Saint Paul during the 1924–25 academic year and head football coach for the Pipers in the fall of 1924.

Later life and death
In 1925, he was elected as the first president of the W Club, the University of Wisconsin's lettermen's association, as well as a member of the board of directors of the Wisconsin Alumni Association in 1943.  He was also a member of the Iron Cross Society, the university's leadership honorary.

Buser died in Minneapolis, Minnesota in 1956.

Head coaching record

College

See also
 List of University of Florida faculty and administrators
 List of University of Wisconsin–Madison people

References

Bibliography
  2012 Florida Football Media Guide, University Athletic Association, Gainesville, Florida (2012).
 Carlson, Norm, University of Florida Football Vault: The History of the Florida Gators, Whitman Publishing, LLC, Atlanta, Georgia (2007).  .
 Golenbock, Peter, Go Gators!  An Oral History of Florida's Pursuit of Gridiron Glory, Legends Publishing, LLC, St. Petersburg, Florida (2002).  .
 McCarthy, Kevin M.,  Fightin' Gators: A History of University of Florida Football, Arcadia Publishing, Mount Pleasant, South Carolina (2000).  .
 McEwen, Tom, The Gators: A Story of Florida Football, The Strode Publishers, Huntsville, Alabama (1974).  .
 Proctor, Samuel, & Wright Langley, Gator History: A Pictorial History of the University of Florida, South Star Publishing Company, Gainesville, Florida (1986).  .

1888 births
1956 deaths
American football guards
American football tackles
American male shot putters
Florida Gators athletic directors
Florida Gators football coaches
Hamline Pipers athletic directors
Hamline Pipers football coaches
Wisconsin Badgers football players
Wisconsin Badgers men's track and field athletes
High school football coaches in Minnesota
All-American college football players
University of Florida faculty
Sportspeople from Madison, Wisconsin
Coaches of American football from Wisconsin
Players of American football from Wisconsin
Track and field athletes from Wisconsin